The 1976 DFB-Pokal Final decided the winner of the 1975–76 DFB-Pokal, the 33rd season of Germany's knockout football cup competition. It was played on 26 June 1976 at the Waldstadion in Frankfurt. Hamburger SV won the match 2–0 against 1. FC Kaiserslautern, to claim their 2nd cup title.

Route to the final
The DFB-Pokal began with 128 teams in a single-elimination knockout cup competition. There were a total of six rounds leading up to the final. Teams were drawn against each other, and the winner after 90 minutes would advance. If still tied, 30 minutes of extra time was played. If the score was still level, a replay would take place at the original away team's stadium. If still level after 90 minutes, 30 minutes of extra time was played. If the score was still level, a penalty shoot-out was used to determine the winner.

Note: In all results below, the score of the finalist is given first (H: home; A: away).

Match

Details

References

External links
 Match report at kicker.de 
 Match report at WorldFootball.net
 Match report at Fussballdaten.de 

Hamburger SV matches
1. FC Kaiserslautern matches
1975–76 in German football cups
1976
Football in Frankfurt
Sports competitions in Frankfurt
1970s in Frankfurt
June 1976 sports events in Europe